Kai ǃGarib is an administrative area in the ZF Mgcawu District of Northern Cape in South Africa. The name Kai ǃGarib originates from the Khoi language and means "big great river", referring to the Orange River that flows through the area.

Main places
The 2001 census divided the municipality into the following main places:

Politics 

The municipal council consists of nineteen members elected by mixed-member proportional representation. Ten councillors are elected by first-past-the-post voting in ten wards, while the remaining nine are chosen from party lists so that the total number of party representatives is proportional to the number of votes received. In the election of 1 November 2021 the African National Congress (ANC) won a majority of ten seats on the council.
The following table shows the results of the election.

References

External links
 http://www.kaigarib.gov.za/

Local municipalities of the ZF Mgcawu District Municipality